N85  may refer to:

Roads 
 N85 road (Ireland)
 N-85 National Highway, in the Pakistan
 Nebraska Highway 85, in the United States

Other uses 
 Alexandria Airport (New Jersey), in Hunterdon County, New Jersey, United States
 , a German submarine surrendered to the Royal Navy after the Second World War
 Nokia N85, a smartphone
 Yugul language